Xhulian Rrudho (pronounced ; born 9 September 1987 in Lushnjë) is an Albanian former footballer who last played for KF Tirana.

Club career
After moving to Italy as a child, he started his professional career with Italian Serie C1/B team Ancona. On 31 January 2007 he agreed a permanent move to Serie A club Chievo.

On 3 March 2007 he played his first (and only) Serie A match for Chievo against AC Milan In the 2007 summer market he was farmed to Tuscan Serie C2 team Sansovino in co-ownership deal, where he spent the first half of the 2007–08 season along with goalkeeper Antonino Saviano, defenders Leonardo Moracci (loan), Marcus N'Ze, midfielders Maycol Andriani and Luca Spinetti. On 31 January 2008 he left Sansovino and agreed to move to Scafatese, another Serie C2 team, in a loan deal.

In July 2008 he returned to his native Albania, joining Partizani Tirana. In January 2009 he moved to KF Tirana, another top flight Albanian club, but he sued the club in October 2011 citing the club still owed him money. As his football career had been derailed, he finished his professional career at only 23.

Legal issues 
In February 2013 he was arrested in Ancona for drug trade after a police investigation in Montacuto (Piedmont); his house was full of materials used for packing the drugs.

References

1987 births
Living people
Sportspeople from Lushnjë
Association football forwards
Albanian footballers
Albania under-21 international footballers
A.C. Ancona players
A.C. ChievoVerona players
A.C. Sansovino players
FK Partizani Tirana players
KF Tirana players
Serie A players
Kategoria Superiore players
Albanian expatriate footballers
Expatriate footballers in Italy
Albanian expatriate sportspeople in Italy
Albanian drug traffickers
Albanian people imprisoned abroad